Wolfgang Moser (born December 3, 1974 in Moultonborough, New Hampshire) is an American rower.  He graduated from Harvard University in 1998.

References 

 
 

1974 births
Living people
American male rowers
Olympic rowers of the United States
Rowers at the 2000 Summer Olympics
Rowers at the 2004 Summer Olympics
People from Moultonborough, New Hampshire
World Rowing Championships medalists for the United States
Sportspeople from Carroll County, New Hampshire
Harvard Crimson rowers